Jean Poiret, born Jean Poiré (17 August 1926 – 14 March 1992), was a French actor, director, and screenwriter. He is primarily known as the author of the original play La Cage aux Folles.

Early career
Poiret was born in Paris, and first rose to prominence in 1951 playing the role of Fred Transport, one of the heroes of Pierre Dac and Francis Blanche's radio series Malheur aux Barbus. In 1952, he met his future co-star of La Cage Michel Serrault at the Sarah Bernhardt Theatre. Together, they starred in the sketch "Jerry Scott, Vedette Internationale".

In 1961, Poiret, as a member of the French cinematic society Pathé, wrote and recorded La Vache à Mille Francs, a parody of La Valse à Mille Temps by Jacques Brel.

In 1973, he married actress Caroline Cellier, with whom he had one child.

La Cage aux Folles 
In 1973, Poiret wrote and starred in the stage play La Cage aux Folles.  Its film adaptation in 1978 eventually brought Poiret immense success. Although Poiret was replaced by Italian actor Ugo Tognazzi in the role of Renato Baldi, Serrault reprised his stage-role of Zaza Napoli and won a César Award for his work.

Later career 
In 1992, Poiret directed his first and only film, Le Zèbre (The Zebra). This adaptation of Alexandre Jardin's novel starred Thierry Lhermitte and Caroline Cellier and was one of the top ten grossing films in France for the year and the highest-grossing debut European film for the year with a gross of $12 million.

Poiret died of a heart attack in Paris on 14 March 1992, three months before the film's premiere. He is buried at the Cimetière du Montparnasse in Paris.

Filmography 

1953: Le Gang des pianos à bretelles (by Gilles de Turenne) - Le présentateur de 'La nuit brune' (uncredited)
1953: Les 3 Mousquetaires (by André Hunebelle)
1956: Cette sacrée gamine (by Michel Boisrond) - first inspector
1956: La Vie est belle (by Roger Pierre and Jean-Marc Thibault) - maracas player
1956: Assassins et voleurs (by Sacha Guitry) - Philippe d'Artois
1956: The Terror with Women (by Jean Boyer) - gendarme
1957: Adorables démons (by Maurice Cloche) - Julien Willis Jr
1957: Le naïf aux quarante enfants (by Philippe Agostini) - Master Bardine
1957: Ça aussi c'est Paris (Short, by Maurice Cloche) - reporter
1957: Clara et les méchants (by Raoul André) - Chantuer - un gangster
1959: Nina (by Jean Boyer) - Adolphe Tessier
1959: Oh ! Qué Mambo (by John Berry) - inspector Sapin
1959: Messieurs les ronds de cuir (by Henri Diamant-Berger) - René Lahrier
1959: Vous n'avez rien à déclarer ? (by Clément Duhour) - Robert de Trivelin
1960: La française et l'amour (by Charles Spaak) - Michel's lawyer (sketch Le divorce)
1960: Candide ou l'optimisme du XXe siècle (by Norbert Carbonnaux) - 1st policeman
1961: Ma femme est une panthère (by Raymond Bailly) - psychiatrist
1961: Auguste (by Pierre Chevalier) - Georges Flower
1962: Les parisiennes (by Michel Boisrond, Francis Cosne and Annette Wademant) - Jean-Pierre Leroy (segment "Antonia")
1962: The Dance (by Norbert Carbonnaux) - Old man
1962: It's Not My Business (by Jean Boyer) - Jean Duroc
1962: How to Succeed in Love (by Michel Boisrond) - Bernard Monod
1962: Les quatre vérités (by Hervé Bromberger) - Renard (Fox) (segment "Le corbeau et le renard")
1963: Les vierges (by Jean-Pierre Mocky) - the banker Marchaix
1963: Un drôle de paroissien (by Jean-Pierre Mocky) - Raoul
1963: La foire aux cancres (by Louis Daquin) - Collin
1964: Les durs à cuire ou comment supprimer son prochain sans perdre l'appétit (by Jacques Pinoteau) - Louis
1964: Jealous as a Tiger (by Darry Cowl) - doctor Raymond
1964: La grande frousse (by Jean-Pierre Mocky) - Loupiac
1965: Les baratineurs (by Francis Rigaud) - André
1965: La bonne occase (by Michel Drach) - Grégoire
1965: La tête du client (by Jacques Poitrenaud) - Philippe / Monsieur Paul
1965: Le petit monstre (by Jean-Paul Sassy) - the godfather
1966: Your Money or Your Life (by Jean-Pierre Mocky) - Lucien Pélépan
1967: Le grand bidule by Raoul André) - Verdier
1967: Ces messieurs de la famille (by Raoul André) - Bernard Le Gall
1968: La grande lessive (!) (by Jean-Pierre Mocky) - Jean-Michel Lavalette
1969: Aux frais de la princesse (by Roland Quignon) - Santos
1969: Trois hommes sur un cheval (by Marcel Moussy) - Tout / Freddy
1969: Ces messieurs de la gâchette (by Raoul André) - Bernard Le Gall
1970: Le Mur de l'Atlantique (by Marcel Camus) - Armand
1971: Mais qu'est-ce qui fait courir les crocodiles ? (by Jacques Poitrenaud) - Gontran
1979: La Gueule de l'autre (by Pierre Tchernia) - Jean-Louis Constant
1980: Le Dernier Métro (by François Truffaut) - Jean-Loup Cottins
1982:  (by Denys Granier-Deferre) - André Joeuf
1984:  (by Claude Pinoteau) - Jean Michelis
1985: Poulet au vinaigre (by Claude Chabrol) - Inspector Jean Lavardin
1985:  (by Jean Yanne) - the caliph
1986: Inspecteur Lavardin (by Claude Chabrol) - Inspector Jean Lavardin
1986:  (by Gérard Krawczyk) - Orlando Higgin
1987: Le Miraculé (by Jean-Pierre Mocky) - Papu
1988: Les saisons du plaisir (by Jean-Pierre Mocky) - Bernard Germain
1988: Corentin (by Jean Marboeuf) - the exorcist
1988: Une nuit à l'Assemblée Nationale (by Jean-Pierre Mocky) - Octave Leroy
1988: La petite amie (by Luc Béraud) - Martin Morel
1990: Lacenaire (by Francis Girod) - Aliard
1992: Sup de fric (by Christian Gion) - Cyril Dujardin
1991:  (by Christoph Böll) - Herzog Max
2007: La méthode Barnol (by Jean-Pierre Mocky) - M. Hubert (final appearance)

References

External links
 
 

1926 births
1992 deaths
French male film actors
French male stage actors
20th-century French dramatists and playwrights
Burials at Montparnasse Cemetery
20th-century French male actors